OS-tan is an Internet meme consisting of moe anthropomorphs of popular operating systems, originating on the Japanese imageboard Futaba Channel. The designs of OS-tan, which were created by various amateur Japanese artists, are typically female; for example, the personifications of Microsoft Windows operating systems are often depicted as sisters of varying ages. The -tan element in the term is a hypocoristic suffix in Japanese that implies extremely youthful endearment.

Though initially appearing only in fan works, the OS-tan proved popular enough that Microsoft branches in Singapore and Taiwan used the OS-tan concept as the basis for ad campaigns for Internet Explorer and Microsoft Silverlight, respectively.

History
The concept of the OS-tan is reported to have begun as a personification of the common perception of Windows Me (Released in 2000 by Microsoft as the 9x counterpart to Windows 2000) as unstable and prone to frequent crashes. Discussions on Futaba Channel likened this to the stereotype of a fickle, troublesome girl and as this personification expanded Me-tan was created and followed by the other characters. One of the early works to predominantly feature the OS-tan was an interactive Flash animation showing a possible intro to an imaginary anime show known as Trouble Windows. A fansub of this was eventually created and is partly responsible for the spread of the OS-tan to English language imageboards.

Commercial products
Ohzora Publishing produced one book based on OS-tan characters, titled  . It includes illustrations by over 25 contributors. It also includes 95-tan, ME-tan, XP-tan figures, titled OS Girl 95, OS Girl me, OS Girl XP respectively, but include a molded space for 2k-tan (named OS Girl 2K).

ME-tan, 2K-tan, XP-tan were designed by GUHICO of Stranger Workshop, while 95-tan was designed by Fujisaki Shiro from H.B.Company.

Parthenon Production Limited, company had commercialized Pink Company's OS-tan products.

MALINO from Deja Vu ArtWorks produced the Me Document and Shared Folder! trilogy, which were sold in digital format.

Japanese version of Windows 7 Ultimate DSP Edition includes the unofficial Nanami Madobe mascot. This inspired Microsoft Taiwan to launch an official mascot for Microsoft Silverlight, Hikaru. This was followed up by giving Hikaru "sisters", Lei, Aoi, and Yu.

A special package of the Japanese Windows 7 Ultimate DSP Edition, called the Touch Mouse Artist Edition or Touch Mouse Limited Edition Artist Series, came with an animated tutorial Windows theme (with custom sounds and three desktop backgrounds) featuring Madobe Nanami.

In 2009, an Ubuntu-based comic titled Ubunchu! was serialized in Kantan Ubuntu!, a spinoff from Weekly ASCII magazine. It was authored by Hiroshi Seo, with English version translated by Fumihito Yoshida, Hajime Mizuno, Martin Owens, Arturo Silva, and Anton Ekblad.

Tan suffix
In this case, the mispronunciation is used intentionally to achieve the contrived cute or charming effect that is commonly associated with its use by young children and is also sometimes added to the names of non-mascot characters. The personifications as a whole are commonly simply called mascots or mascot characters, and as such the -tan suffix itself means nothing outside its role as an honorific and its implications of cuteness. Normal suffixes, including -san, -chan, and -kun are also used in the name of some OS-tan, depending on the character and the speaker's preference; the suffix may indeed be omitted entirely.

New Generation OS-tans
While there are mascots of Windows versions from 7 to 10, there is currently no such mascot for Windows 11.

Windows 10
The name of the Windows 10 mascot was officially introduced as Tōko (or Touko) Madobe on 31 July 2015. As confirmed on the character's official Facebook page, her name is a homonym for one of the readings for the Japanese word for 'ten': . Her name was chosen by fans through an online poll. According to her fictional profile, her origins are the Madobe family and she is set 100 years in the future. She likes online gaming and supporting others. Her personal traits are being an excellent student, and expanding her knowledge on technology. Her manager often worries since she’s a bit spontaneous. She also enjoys cheering on people who are working hard and doing their best. She has a part-time job at the Akibano Custom Computer Company where she is a rookie. This level of back story is rather unusual for OS-tan.

Windows 8.1
The Japanese Windows 8.1 Pro DSP edition Madobe Family version by Windows Navi+ (Techno-Alliance Corp.) is a limited (1000 units) version of Windows 8.1 Pro 32/64-bit edition with three types of Madobe family picture password wallpapers, Madobe character voices (Nanami, Yū, Ai, Claudia), Madobe family complete edition Windows theme pack, previously unpublished Madobe family designs, Final Pasocom Data Hikkoshi 9+ licence key, Skype three-month free trial, historical Windows logo stickers (XP, Vista, 7, 8). Other editions include a Memorial Pack version without voice, theme pack, stickers (6191 units); a 64-bit Windows Memorial Pack version with a Sculpt Mobile Mouse with Nanami decor (810 units). These editions were available for preorder on 2013-10-04 with release date on 2013-10-18. As part of the market launch, a Facebook draw of 8 followers took place when follower count reaches 80001; and total Twitter follower count for Yū and Ai reach 8001, where winners receive Yū- and Ai-themed prizes.

Additional types of Windows 8.1 Pro DSP edition Madobe family theme packs were also sold by Ark (TowerHill), ZOA Corporation, Tsukumo (Project White), Dospara, Buy More (Unit.com), Big Camera (Sofmap), and PC One. These versions include two types of wallpapers (Christmas, New Year), theme pack with system voices.

Windows 8
The Japanese Windows 8 Pro DSP editions were released in Madobe Yū (or Yuu) and Madobe Ai editions by Windows Navi+ (Techno-Alliance Corp.). Both versions (4,000 units per character, thus 8,000 total) include a Microsoft Wedge touch mouse with the Windows 8 logo, character-specific Windows theme (three theme pack wallpapers, event sounds in the respective character's voice), picture password images. In addition, Limited Akihabara Editions (444 units per character, 888 total), sold in Tokyo's Akihabara shopping district, include Madobe Ai/Yū edition of Microsoft Wedge Touch Mouse, an alternate character-specific event sound samples and theme pack and an alternate wallpaper for its respective character. Nipponbashi versions (500 units per character), sold in Nipponbashi in Osaka, include Microsoft Wedge touch mouse (with Ai and Yū decal), three theme pack wall papers (two common and one character-specific), and Yū or Ai event sounds. The Nipponbashi packages include different art. The 32/64-bit version availability depends on retailer.

Asuka Nishi voices the short-haired Yū, while Nao Tamura voices the long-haired Ai.

The Windows 8 Can Edition from Unitcom (available for the first 2,888 copies) included notepad, T-shirt, two-way mouse pad, pocket media case, smart phone stand cleaning, two-way PC cleaner, Yū and Ai badges, and a freeze blanket.

The extended fictional Madobe family tree detailed that Yū is the older sister, and their parents are Eiichi from the Netsu (根津) family and Shii from the Madobe family. Yū and Ai were said to have a birthdate of 18 November 1996 (Windows CE's release date) with age 15, with height of 152 cm. This conflicts with other back-story materials suggesting that Ai is the younger sister.

MasatakaP and Electrocutica produced a Windows 8 music video titled "Through the Window", featuring Madobe characters Nanami, Yū (in silhouette), and Claudia. The video was presented as the opening to Microsoft's keynote on the second day of Windows Developer Days in Japan.

In 2012 and 2013, Windows Navi+ (Techno-Alliance Corp.) also created separate Twitter accounts for Ai and Yū, respectively.

Two theme songs for Yū and Ai – "Mir8cle Days" and "Donna Mirai Demo" were unveiled on 15 June 2013, and sold as a CD bundled with Windows 8 Pro DSP Edition, sold at TwinBox Akihabara.

Windows 7
Akiba PC reported that the first 7777 copies of Japanese Windows 7 Ultimate DSP editions include special wallpaper and sound sets for a character called , voiced by Nana Mizuki. The character was designed by Wakaba. The premium set includes a Windows 7 theme featuring 3 Nanami wallpapers, 19 event sound sets, CD with 5 extra Nanami sounds. Regular DSP edition includes a digest Windows 7 theme including a Nanami wallpaper, an event sound set; the preorder users can also download an extra Nanami wallpaper and 6 event sound sets. This makes it the first OS-tan marketed by the company producing the operating system. In addition, the character also got its own Twitter account.

During the initial sales event of the Windows 7 DSP edition, the official profile of the character has also been revealed. It shows Madobe Nanami was born in 1992-04-06 (release date of Windows 3.1) 17 years of age(at the time of release), who lives in Chiyoda, Tokyo. Nanami is among an extended family of 16 members, and she has elder brother named Goichi (吾一), elder sister named Mutsumi (むつみ), mother named Mikaho (美佳穗) from Madobe (窓辺) family, father named Kyuuachi (究八) from Shirato (白戸) family. Nanami and her cousin Claudia Madobe (クロード(蔵人)) later appeared in Microsoft's Cloud Girl comic strip.

Original OS-tans

Windows Vista
Windows Vista's most distinguishing characteristic is usually her horn-shaped pigtails (some variants have up to four pigtails) and heterochromatic eyes. Silver or white hair appears to be the most frequent, although light blue and black are also seen. A common costume design was a white and red sailor fuku and stockings. Since the release of more details about Vista's interface, her look has changed slightly. A black maid's outfit is now emerging in popularity (which matches the new default Vista color scheme), as well as a circular Windows logo hair clip, identical to the new Start Menu button in Vista. There also seems to be a more finalized version who has a hair color similar to that of Vista wallpapers, with a range from light blue, to yellow, to green. She also wears a type of long coat (which only covers her left and right sides) which are transparent to imitate that of the Aero glass effect.

Windows XP
XP-tan is a dark-haired girl with ribbons in her hair and an "XP" hair ornament typically worn on the left side. As Windows XP is criticized for bloating a system and being very pretty without being as useful, XP-tan is commonly depicted wearing tight clothing with big breasts. Additionally, as a reference to the memory usage of Windows XP, she is often seen eating or holding an empty rice bowl labeled "Memory". Some variants include a version for XP Home known as "Homeko" who has green hair which she wears in a short ponytail with two large XP-shaped hairclips that cover her ears, as well as a less common variation representing Windows XP Media Center Edition. The outfits worn by the two main variants are based on the loading lines at the Windows splash screen during startup. And XP tan can handle a max of 4 GB of RAM (3.5 GB she can use).

Windows 2000
Although a few variants exist, the most common operating system represented is Windows 2000 Professional. She is typically drawn as an intelligent, professional, reserved looking woman with short blue hair, glasses, and hair clips that resemble cat ears flanking a small white bonnet or ruffle, similar to a maid's bonnet, that shows the Windows logo. Her outfit resembles a swimsuit suggesting the Windows logo colors worn with long blue coat, alluding to the popular opinion that Windows 2000 is the most stable and dependable of the Windows operating systems. Due to the greater stability of Win2K compared with WinME, which was released near 2000, 2K-tan is often described as the guardian of ME-tan. The particular shade of blue used in most drawings is similar to the default Windows 2000 desktop color.

Windows ME
The design of ME-tan, the personification of Windows Me, is very much in line with the Japanese concept of kawaii or cuteness.  Her design has changed little from the artist's original designs and is depicted with green hair in long pigtails wearing a maid outfit with a "!" badge on the front reminiscent of the Windows Me Active Desktop Recovery screen, often shown after rebooting from a system crash in Me. While she is considered to be a hard worker, webcomics often depict her failing at anything she tries to do, often literally crashing and irritating her sisters. When she is not frozen or out of control, she tends to do things showing a lack of common sense or knowledge, such as putting a soda can into a microwave oven or defending herself by swinging a Welsh onion.

Windows 98 and 98SE
While many variations exist the most common depiction of the Windows 98 operating systems is a pair of young girls. The OS-tan representative of the original release of Windows 98 is shown in a white and blue uniform that includes the Windows logo as part of a neck tie, navy blue hair, and a "98" hair clip. The Windows 98 Second Edition OS-tan is similar in appearance, but wears a green sailor school uniform with the letters "SE" on the front. Two early representations that are also seen are a pair of stick-limbed Pocky boxes with a face and version number drawn in crayon. This is a reference to Vulcan 300, a character from the Zatch Bell! anime series. These early representations are still used as a mecha piloted by the girls, dolls carried by the girls, or sometimes even as hiding places for them.

Windows 95
As Windows 95 is considered to be the oldest of the modern 32-bit Windows operating systems, it is usually represented as a traditional lady from the early modern era of Japan. She is typically depicted as a gentle-looking brown haired woman in a kimono, with a hair ribbon showing the four Windows colors. Her outfit is a traditional kimono and a hakama of Japan and she wears thick sandals, or geta, on her feet. These were a woman college student's typical clothes as seen in the earliest period during the course of the modernization in Japan (from the Meiji period to the Taishō period) and is a reference to the modernization of Windows in comparison to the modernization of Japan. Additionally, the pattern of her kimono is based on the file "hana256.bmp", which was used as a desktop wallpaper pattern in the Japanese version of Windows. She is typically depicted as engaged in drinking tea, serving meals or doing other housework. One recurring theme in stories is her unfamiliarity with newer, post Win-95 technologies, such as USB devices (even though the OSR 2.x supported it) and broadband internet connections. She is also occasionally depicted wielding a katana in an aggressive manner, symbolizing that it was with her generation of operating systems that Microsoft finally achieved full dominance of the personal computer market.

Windows 3.1

Windows 3.1 is a short girl with long silver hair, a long light purple dress, and a large purple bow on her head. She is often seen carrying a small, black cat on her head as well. She acts as a servant, or a maid of some sort, who serves and tends to DOS-tan. This is a reference to the fact that Windows 3.1 is not a full operating system, but rather just a GUI for MS-DOS.

Mac OS X

The Mac OS X girl is often portrayed as a catgirl, following with the Apple "wild cat" naming tradition (every Mac OS X release until OS X Mavericks had a codename like Jaguar, Panther, Tiger, Snow Leopard, etc.). Otherwise, she is shown as an older variation of the Mac OS 9 girl, wearing a white coat and wearing an AirPort wireless hub fashioned as a hat. She is occasionally shown holding a publication of some sort, as Macs are often used for desktop publishing.

Linux

Originally seen as a bearded penguin (a reference to Tux, the penguin mascot of the Linux kernel), an image of a girl with a helmet and flippers was chosen as a human alternative. Her helmet (most likely a metaphor for the Linux kernel's oft-claimed excellent security) usually has horns on it, likely a reference to the GNU software which comprises the common system programs present in nearly all Linux distributions. The gear teeth on the helmet are a reference to KDE, a common desktop environment used with Linux. The foot symbol on her shirt is a reference to GNOME, another common desktop environment. She is often seen with a spear that has flags attached representing the GRUB, LILO and GCC tools for Linux.

MSX-DOS
The MSX-DOS girl is often portrayed as a young but grey-haired girl carrying a large cartridge-shaped bag with an MSX-DOS logo on it. There is even a short game featuring this OS-tan as player character. The bag this OS-tan is often shown holding is cartridge-shaped, likely because MSXDOS2 required an cartridge with an extra 64 KB of ROM in order to work.

American -tan
Some Americanized versions of Windows related OS-tan, named XP-USA, Me-USA, and 2K-USA, were published in the Ohzora's FanBook in a comic strip named "Trouble Windows in USA", by Saint Muscle.

Supporting characters

Because of heavy associations between operating systems and their supporting programs, such as anti-virus clients and Web browsers, many supporting characters have been created to personify the idiosyncrasies of these applications. Some examples are:
 Amazon Kindle: Kindle-kun
 Chromium: Chrome-tan
 DOS: DOS-tan
 Internet Explorer/Microsoft Edge: Inori Aizawa (IE-tan)
 McAfee: Miss McAfee
 Mozilla Firefox: Firefox-tan;  Foxkeh Norton Utilities: Dr. Norton
 Opera: Opera-tan
 Silverlight: Hikaru Aizawa
 Microsoft Azure: Claudia Madobe

Critical receptionWired News'' rated OS-tan among the "Lamest Technology Mascots Ever", yet "strangely compelling".

See also
 CG artwork
 Mecha Musume
 Moe anthropomorphism
 List of computing mascots

References

External links

 OS-tan Collections Wiki (Hasn’t been updated since 2019 and has some outdated information)
 

Doujinshi
Anime and manga fandom
Moe anthropomorphism
OS-tan and related characters
Internet memes
Operating system advocacy